Cuts Both Ways is the debut solo album by American recording artist Gloria Estefan. Though the release marked the first time Estefan was billed solely as a solo artist, Miami Sound Machine still performed instrumentation for the album. It has sold over 4 million copies worldwide.

In some Spanish-speaking territories, the album was titled Doblemente Herida.

History
In 1987, after a decade of being the lead singer of Miami Sound Machine, she was credited above the group name (Gloria Estefan and Miami Sound Machine) on their album Let It Loose. By 1989, Gloria Estefan was one of the most successful female Latin artists in the world. With the release of Cuts Both Ways, Estefan was marketed as a solo artist, but Miami Sound Machine continued to perform as her backing band in the studio and on tour (however, the only original member of MSM to play on the album besides Estefan was her husband/producer, Emilio).

The album reached the top ten on the US Billboard 200 chart and peaked at number 1 in the UK and Australia.

The first single from the album was "Don't Wanna Lose You", which became one of Estefan's biggest hits, reaching number 1 on the US Billboard Hot 100 (her second US number one) and was certified Gold by the RIAA. It also reached the top ten in the Netherlands, Ireland and the UK. Later releases from Cuts Both Ways were the commercially successful singles "Here We Are", "Oye mi Canto", and "Get on Your Feet". The title track was released as the final single from the album and was a number one hit on the Billboard Adult Contemporary chart.

Jon Secada provided background vocals for the album. Emilio Estefan, Jorge Casas and Clay Ostwald received a Grammy Award nomination for Producer of the Year, Non-Classical for their work in Cuts Both Ways.

Track listing

Singles

Release history

Charts

Weekly charts

Year-end charts

Certifications and sales

Personnel

Miami Sound Machine
Gloria Estefan: lead and backing vocals
Randy Barlow: trumpet, backing vocals
Teddy Mulet: trumpet, trombone, backing vocals
Jorge Casas: bass guitar, acoustic guitar, programming, backing vocals
Mike Scaglione: saxophone
Clay Ostwald: synthesizer, piano, programming
John De Faria: electric guitar, acoustic guitar
Robert Rodriguez: drums
Rafael Padilla: percussion
Horns on "Oye Mi Canto (Hear My Voice)" and "Oye Mi Canto" (Spanish version) arranged by Teddy Mulet, Gloria Estefan, Jorge Casas and Clay Ostwald
Paquito Hechavarría: piano
Paco Fonta: acoustic guitar
Michael Thompson: electric guitar
Emilio Estefan Jr.: congas
John Slick: additional programming
Jon Secada, Betty Wright: backing vocals

Production
Arranged by Gloria Estefan (tracks 1, 2, 5, 6, 7, 11 and 12), Jorge Casas (all tracks), Clay Ostwald (all tracks), John De Faria (track 8), Scott Shapiro (track 5), John Haag (track 5), Tom McWilliams (track 5) and Efrain Enriquez (track 9)
Produced by Emilio Estefan, Clay Ostwald and Jorge Casas for Estefan Enterprises, Inc.
Recorded by Eric Schilling; assisted by John Haag and Ted Stein; additional assistants: Dana Horowitz, Steve Whaley and Roger Hughes
Mixed by Eric Schilling, except "Don't Wanna Lose You" (mixed by Humberto Gatica; assisted by Greg Laney and Mauricio Guerrero), "Here We Are" and "Cuts Both Ways" (mixed by Phil Ramone and Eric Schilling; assisted by Carlos Nieto) and "Oye Mi Canto" (additional mixing by John Haag)
Recorded and mixed by Criteria Studios (Miami, Florida)
Mastered by Bob Ludwig

Design
 Art direction: Nancy Donald, David Coleman
 Photography: Randee St. Nicholas
 Gloria Estefan's hair and makeup: Eric Bernard
 Band hair and makeup: Samy
 Wardrobe: Vivian Turner

References

1989 debut albums
Gloria Estefan albums
Albums produced by Emilio Estefan
Epic Records albums